Medellín is a city and municipality in the Antioquia Department, Colombia.

Medellín can also refer to:

Geography 
Metropolitan Area of Medellín, the metropolitan area of the Colombian city
Medellín, Spain, a municipality in the province of Badajoz, Extremadura, Spain
Medellin, Cebu, a second class municipality in Cebu Province, Philippines
Medellín, Veracruz, one of the municipalities of Veracruz, Mexico
Medellín River, a river in Colombia

People
Antonio Medellín (1942–2017), Mexican actor
Antonio Medellín Varela (b. 1957), Mexican politician
Enriqueta Medellín Legorreta (1948–2022), Mexican environmentalist
José Medellín (1975–2008), Mexican citizen executed by Texas
Rodrigo Medellín (b. 1957), Mexican ecologist

Other 
Medellín Cartel, a Colombian drug trafficking cartel run by Pablo Escobar
Independiente Medellín a football (soccer) team
Battle of Medellín, a battle during the Peninsular war
Medellin, a fictional film about Pablo Escobar in the American television series Entourage
"Medellin", a song performed by  Versus The World
Medellín v. Texas, 552 U.S. 491 (2008), a United States Supreme Court case dealing with José Medellín
 "Medellín" (song), 2019 single by Madonna and Maluma